Francisco Sanjosé García (born 12 November 1952) is a Spanish former professional footballer who played as a defender for Sevilla. He competed with the Spain Olympic football team in the men's tournament at the 1976 Summer Olympics.

References

External links
 

1952 births
Living people
Footballers from Seville
Spanish footballers
Association football defenders
Olympic footballers of Spain
Footballers at the 1976 Summer Olympics
La Liga players
Segunda División players
Sevilla FC players
Sevilla Atlético players